River Kwai can refer to multiple rivers in western Thailand:
Khwae Yai River
Khwae Noi River

See also
 The Bridge on the River Kwai, a film
 The Bridge over the River Kwai, a novel